The Chicago International Documentary Film Festival (CIDF) is a festival of documentary films in the United States. The film event was established in 2003 and is dedicated to the celebration and cultivation of the documentary film. Over $50,000 in unrestricted cash plus other prizes are awarded by the jury.

CIDF is presented by the Society for Arts.

External links
Homepage

Documentary film festivals in the United States
Film festivals in Chicago
Film festivals established in 2003